La Trampa is the second studio album by Mexican singer Ana Bárbara, released in 1995.

Track listing
 "La Trampa"
 "Olvidame Si Puedes"
 "Me Asusta, Pero Me Gusta"
 "Sueños de Maria"
 "Amor de Luna"
 "Recuerdas, Mi Amor?"
 "No Se Que Voy a Hacer"
 "Salte de Mi"
 "Si Tu Quieres Ser Feliz aka Disco Cumbia"
 "Otro Corazon"
 "Sin Mentiras"

Chart performance

References

1996 albums
Ana Bárbara albums
Fonovisa Records albums